Goldenwest Credit Union is a federally chartered credit union headquartered in Ogden, Utah, regulated under the authority of the National Credit Union Administration (NCUA). As of January 1, 2015 Goldenwest serves over 100,000 members, holds over $1 billion in assets, and operates 26 branches throughout Utah. Goldenwest is a not-for profit, financial cooperative that is owned, governed and operated by its members. Goldenwest exists to provide financial products and services that members require to succeed.

History
The history and organization of Goldenwest Credit Union goes back to the 1930s as the people of Utah were recovering from the great depression.

Mr. Volta D. Perry, a car inspector for the Ogden Railway and Depot Company, heard of the Federal Credit Union Act of 1934 by the U.S. Congress. His investigation led to the organization of the Ogden Railway and Depot Company Employees Federal Credit Union on May 13, 1936.

The organizational meeting took place in the Union Depot Building Old Timer’s Hall in Ogden. The founders were seven men who were employed by the Ogden Railway and Depot Company. Assets at the organizational date were $10.50.

In 1940, the name was modified to Ogden Railway Employees Federal Credit Union as the field of membership had been enlarged to include all of the railroad workers in the Ogden yards. The name changed again over next 20 years as the words “Employees” and “Federal” were dropped. In 1984, members voted to change the name of Ogden Railway Credit Union to Goldenwest Credit Union to be more representative of the expanding membership base.

Early operations were conducted from the home of the treasurer Irving L. Christensen. Later, the credit union office was housed in a small room at the Union Depot. It was 20 years before an official credit union office was rented a few blocks from the railroad yards. On June 9, 1962, a new building was dedicated on 26th Street in downtown Ogden. Goldenwest was the first credit union in Utah to build its own facility. In the year 2000, the Corporate Office moved to the existing headquarters at 5025 Adams Avenue in South Ogden.

In 2007, Goldenwest received the honor of being named the "Federal Credit Union of the Year" for credit unions with $150+ million in assets by the National Association Federal Credit Union. Credit unions from around the country were considered for the award, and were judged on topics including: unusual growth; member service; handling adverse situations; sound financial management; consumer education; commitment to community; and, serving low-to-moderate income members.

On October 1, 2013, Goldenwest Credit Union merged with USU Credit Union. USU Credit Union retained its name and USU-affiliated brand as a division of Goldenwest Credit Union. Today, Goldenwest and USU Credit Union serve more than 148,000 members, holds over $1.7 billion in assets, and operates 41 branch offices in Utah from Smithfield to St George.

References

External links
 Goldenwest Credit Union's Website
 USU Credit Union's Website

Credit unions based in Utah
Companies based in Utah
Banks established in 1936
1936 establishments in Utah